Sergey Smiryagin (27 October 1963 – 11 July 2020) was a Russian freestyle swimmer. He competed at the 1980 Summer Olympics in the 100 m freestyle, but failed to reach the final.

After the Olympics he won three European titles and three silver medals at the world championships, as well as a gold medal at the 1983 Summer Universiade. He missed the 1984 Summer Olympics due to their boycott by the Soviet Union and competed in the Friendship Games instead, winning three gold medals.

References

1963 births
2020 deaths
Russian male swimmers
Russian male freestyle swimmers
Olympic swimmers of the Soviet Union
Swimmers at the 1980 Summer Olympics
Soviet male swimmers
World Aquatics Championships medalists in swimming
European Aquatics Championships medalists in swimming
Universiade medalists in swimming
Universiade gold medalists for the Soviet Union
Medalists at the 1983 Summer Universiade